Vladimir Anatolievich Semenikhin (born August 31, 1967) is a Russian businessman, philanthropist, art collector and honorary consul. Semenikhin is the president of the Ekaterina Cultural Foundation, Chairman of the board of directors at Stroyteks Group of companies and the Honorary Consul of Kazakhstan in the Principality of Monaco.

Cultural Influence 

As of the early 2000s, Semenikhin has created a foundation to promote the arts in Russia and has, through it, supported exhibitions at State museums and galleries. It has conducted international exhibitions such as the Knave of Diamonds avant-gardist exhibition in 2004 in the Tretyakov Gallery and in the Russian Museum in St Petersbourg. In 2005, Semenikhin has opened the first private exhibition halls in the center of Moscow.  Since then, it has hosted venues such as the Grace Kelly exhibition in 2009 . 
Semenikhin is also considered as one of Russia's leading art collectors and is believed to have one of the largest private art collections. Semenikhin has encouraged the development of the arts in Russia by hosting exhibitions of Russian painters from the avant-garde movement.

Consular appointment 

Semenikhin has been, since June 15, 2011, the Honorary Consul of Kazakhstan in the Principality of Monaco.  He has organized two state visits occurring in Kazakhstan and in Monaco (2013, 2014) by both heads of state.

Business accomplishments 

Semenikhin has founded his construction company in 1995 in Moscow and named it Stroyteks (Стройтэкс). To date, the corporation has built in excess of a million square meters in the Moscow region. It is now qualified as one of the largest construction companies in the Russian capital.

Awards 

 Knight of the Order of Saint-Charles (2018)
 Officer of the French Legion of Honor (2017) 
 Knight of the French Legion of Honor (2013) 
 Monegasque award for Cultural achievement (2011)

Board affiliations 

Member of the board at the Russian Museum. 
Member of the board of the Kosygin Prize association. 
Member of the board at Monaco Oceanographic Museum 
Member of the Monegasque Attractivity committee

References 

1967 births
Living people
Russian art collectors
Russian philanthropists
Knights of the Order of Cultural Merit (Monaco)
Knights of the Order of Saint-Charles
Officiers of the Légion d'honneur